Blood Brothers is a 2007 Chinese film directed by Alexi Tan and starring Daniel Wu, Shu Qi, Sun Honglei, Liu Ye and Tony Yang.

Plot
The film deals with three friends who move from the countryside to 1930s Shanghai to work with the criminal underworld. In Shanghai, the friends become involved in a dangerous love triangle.

Cast
Daniel Wu as Fung
Liu Ye as Kang
Tony Yang as Xiao Hu
Shu Qi as Lulu
Chang Chen as Mark
Li Xiaolu as Su Zhen
Sun Honglei as Boss Hong
Zhao Jun
Zhang Dianlun
Jet Li

Influences
Blood Brothers is Alexi Tan's first feature film, though Tan has referred to it as "a combination of all my collaborators' work" including costume designer Tim Yip, cinematographer Michel Taburiaux, and of course producer John Woo.

Tan has stated that he draws upon his upbringing as an overseas Chinese, such that his vision of China and Chinese society will at once be Chinese and at the same time "different.". Tan notes that his film is an attempt to combine Eastern and Western influences, in that it is his attempt to transport the style of classic westerns, in particular those of Sergio Leone and Sam Peckinpah, into the setting of 1930s Shanghai.

Production history
The idea for Blood Brothers first began to gain traction when producers John Woo and Terence Chang watched Tan's Double Blade, a music video starring Taiwanese pop star Jay Chou, and contacted Tan expressing interest in producing a feature-length film with the young director. Up to this point, Tan had worked primarily as a fashion photographer. It was co-produced by the Taiwanese production company CMC Entertainment, the mainland Chinese Sil-Metropole Organisation, Terence Chang's Lion Rock Productions and Hong Kong film director John Woo, and is Woo's first time as producer of another director's film.

Once Woo and Chang were on board, however, Tan was able to seriously develop his concept for the film. Given Tan's overseas upbringing and lack of Mandarin speaking and writing ability (he was born in Manila and studied in London), the screenplay was originally written in English. As such, Tan collaborated with native Chinese writer, Jiang Dan to translate his film into natural sounding Chinese. Despite Tan's initial concerns that Jiang Dan would not understand the Leone or Peckinpah influences, he later felt that her contributions to the story helped flesh out the film's romantic elements and in particular expanded upon the feminine perspectives of Shu Qi's and Lulu Li's characters.

Shooting of the film took place entirely within China: primarily in Shanghai, and the outlying town of Zhujiajiao. The main set of the "Paradise Club" (the titular club in the Chinese title), was built in the Shanghai Film and TV Studio under the direction of Production Designer Alfred Yau.

Fight choreography, in particular the film's many gun battles, was done by Hong Kong veteran action director Philip Kwok, who was also involved in the action choreography for John Woo's 1992 Hong Kong film Hard Boiled.

Release
Blood Brothers was selected to close the 64th Venice International Film Festival on September 8, 2007.

The film should not be confused with The Warlords, a 2007 Hong Kong film/Chinese starring Jet Li, Andy Lau and Takeshi Kaneshiro, that was at one point also called Blood Brothers.

Notes

External links
 
 
 Blood Brothers at the Chinese Movie Database
 Blood Brothers at Cinemasie
 Blood Brothers at Hong Kong Cinemagic

2007 films
Taiwanese action films
Triad films
2000s Mandarin-language films
Films set in Shanghai
Films set in the 1930s
Chinese action films
2007 action films
2000s Hong Kong films